The 1878 British Columbia general election was held in 1878.

Political context

Issues and debates

Non-party system 

There were to be no political parties in the new province.  The designations "Government" and "Opposition" and "Independent" (and variations on these) functioned in place of parties, but they were very loose and do not represent formal coalitions, more alignments of support during the campaign.  "Government" meant in support of the current Premier; "Opposition" meant campaigning against him, and often enough the Opposition would win and immediately become the Government.  The Elections British Columbia notes for this election describe the designations as "Government (GOV.) candidates supported the administration of G.A.B. Walkem. Those opposed ran as Reform (REF.), Opposition (OPP.), Independent Reform (IND.REF.), or Independent Opposition (IND.OPP.) candidates. Those who ran as straight Independents (IND.) were sometimes described as Government supporters (IND./GOV.).

The Walkem Government

See Notes on the previous election.

Byelections not shown

Any changes due to byelections are shown below the main table showing the theoretical composition of the House after the election.  A final table showing the composition of the House at the dissolution of the Legislature at the end of this Parliament can be found below the byelections.  The main table represents the immediate results of the election only, not changes in governing coalitions or eventual changes due to byelections.

List of ridings

The original ridings had remained twelve in number, electing 25 members of the first provincial legislature from 12 ridings (electoral districts), some with multiple members.  There were no political parties were not acceptable in the House by convention, though some members were openly partisan at the federal level (usually Conservative, although both Liberal and Labour allegiance were on display by some candidates).

These ridings were:

Cariboo (three members)
Comox
Cowichan (two members)
Esquimalt (two members)
Kootenay (two members)
Lillooet (two members)
Nanaimo
New Westminster (two members)
New Westminster City
Victoria (two members)
Victoria City (four members)
Yale (three members)

Statistics

Votes 	        6,377
Candidates 	46
Members 	25

Vancouver Island 3,714 votes, twelve seats 309.5 votes/seat
Upper Island 695 votes, four seats (173.75 votes/seat)
Comox: 52 votes (52 votes/seat)
Cowichan: 292 votes (2 seats 196 votes/seat 83 voters/seat)
Nanaimo: 351 votes (351 votes/seat)
"Greater Victoria" 3,019 votes, eight seats (377.375 votes/seat):
Victoria: 309 votes (2 seats 154.5 votes/seat)
Victoria City: 2,523 (4 seats 603.75 votes/seat)
Esquimalt: 187 (2 seats 93.5 votes/seat)

Mainland 2,271 votes 11 seats (excluding Kootenay's) 206.45 votes/seat :
Interior 1,817 eight seats, 227.125 votes/seat (excepting Kootenay):
Cariboo: 788 votes (3 seats 264 votes/seat)
Kootenay: unknown (acclamation)
Lillooet: 241 votes (2 seats 51 votes/seat 120.5 votes/seat)
Yale: 788 votes (3 seats 57 votes/seat 262.67 votes/seat)
Lower Mainland 454 votes (3 seats 151.33 votes/seat:
New Westminster: 309 votes (2 seats 154.5 votes/seat)
New Westminster City: 145 votes (145 votes/seat)

Note that these figures refer to votes actually cast, not the population per se nor the total of the potential voters' list.

Polling conditions

Property requirements for voting instigated for the 1875 election were dropped.  Natives (First Nations) and Chinese were disallowed from voting, although naturalized Kanakas (Hawaiian colonists) and American and West Indian blacks and certain others participated.  The requirement that knowledge of English be spoken for balloting was discussed but not applied.

Results by riding 

|-
||    
|align="center"|Edwin Pimbury
|align="center" rowspan=2 |CowichanGovernment
||    
||    
|align="center" rowspan=3 |CaribooOpposition
|align="center"|George Cowan
||    
|-
||    
|align="center"|William Smithe
||    
||    
|align="center"|John Evans
||    
|-
||    
|align="center"|Wellington John Harris
|align="center"  rowspan=2 |New WestminsterGovernment
||    
||    
|align="center"|George Anthony Boomer Walkem1
||    
|-
||    
|align="center"|Donald McGillivray
||    
||    
|align="center"  rowspan=|ComoxOpposition
|align="center"|John Ash
||    
|-
||    
|align="center"|Ebenezer Brown
|align="center"  |New Westminster CityGovernment
||    
||    
|align="center"  rowspan=2 |EsquimaltOpposition
|align="center"|Hans Lars Helgesen
||    
|-
||    
|align="center"|Preston Bennett
|align="center" rowspan=3 |YaleGovernment
||    
||    
|align="center"|Frederick W. Williams
||    
|-
||    
|align="center"|John Andrew Mara
||    
||    
|align="center"  rowspan=2 |KootenayOpposition
|align="center"|Robert Leslie Thomas Galbraith
||    
|-
||    
|align="center"|Forbes George Vernon
||    
||    
|align="center"|Charles Gallagher
||    
|-
|
|
|
|
||    
|align="center"  rowspan=2 |LillooetOpposition
|align="center"|William M. Brown
||    
|-
|
|
|
|
||    
|align="center"|William Saul
||    
|-
|
|
|
|
||    
|align="center"  |NanaimoOpposition
|align="center"|James Atkinson Abrams
||    
|-
|
|
|
|
||    
|align="center" rowspan=2 |VictoriaOpposition
|align="center"|Thomas Basil Humphreys
||    
|-
|
|
|
|
||    
|align="center"|James Thomas McIlmoyl
||    
|-
|
|
|
|
||    
|align="center" rowspan=4 |Victoria CityIndependentOpposition
|align="center"|Robert Beaven 
||    
|-
|
|
|
|
||    
|align="center"|James Smith Drummond
||    
|-
|
|
|
|
||    
|align="center"|John William Williams
||    
|-
|
|
|
|
||    
|align="center"|William Wilson
||    
|-
|
|align-left"|1 Premier-Elect and Incumbent Premier
|-
| align="center" colspan="10"|Source: Elections BC
|-
|}

Byelections 

As customary, byelections were held to confirm the appointment of various members to the Executive Council (cabinet).  In this Parliament, all three such byelections were won by acclamation:

Robert Beaven, Victoria City, July 10, 1878
Thomas Basil Humphreys, Victoria, July 10, 1878
George Anthony Boomer Walkem, Cariboo, August 3, 1878

Walkem's byelection acclamation confirmed him as Premier; Executive Council appointments were decided and made by the Lieutenant-Governor in this period, not by the Premier directly, but by the L-G in Consultation with the Premier (as still is the case, though only as a formal technicality, not in practice).  The Premier's position itself was technically an appointment, as there were no political parties nor leaders, other than unofficial ones for each faction in the House to whom the Lieutenant-Governor would turn if their known caucus was sufficient to form a government.

Other byelections were held on the occasion of death, ill health, retirement and/or resignation for other reasons.  These were won by:

George Ferguson, Cariboo, October 29, 1879  (replacing John Evans, who died August 25, 1879).
William James Armstrong, New Westminster City, Acclaimed December 20, 1879 (day of return of writ).  Byelection caused by resignation of Ebenezer Brown November 1881 because of ill health, Victoria Standard November 19, 1881.

Composition of House at dissolution 
Note: Government/Opposition status applies to candidate at time of election in 1878, not at time of dissolution in 1882.

|-
||    
|align="center"|Edwin Pimbury
|align="center" rowspan=2 |CowichanGovernment
||    
||    
|align="center" rowspan=3 |CaribooOpposition
|align="center"|George Cowan
||    
|-
||    
|align="center"|William Smithe
||    
||    
|align="center"|George Ferguson
||    
|-
||    
|align="center"|Wellington John Harris
|align="center"  rowspan=2 |New WestminsterGovernment
||    
||    
|align="center"|George Anthony Boomer Walkem
||    
|-
||    
|align="center"|Donald McGillivray
||    
||    
|align="center"  rowspan=|ComoxOpposition
|align="center"|John Ash
||    
|-
||    
|align="center"|William James Armstrong
|align="center"  |New Westminster CityGovernment
||    
||    
|align="center"  rowspan=2 |EsquimaltOpposition
|align="center"|Hans Lars Helgesen
||    
|-
||    
|align="center"|Preston Bennett
|align="center" rowspan=3 |YaleGovernment
||    
||    
|align="center"|Frederick W. Williams
||    
|-
||    
|align="center"|John Andrew Mara
||    
||    
|align="center"  rowspan=2 |KootenayOpposition
|align="center"|Robert Leslie Thomas Galbraith
||    
|-
||    
|align="center"|Forbes George Vernon
||    
||    
|align="center"|Charles Gallagher
||    
|-
|
|
|
|
||    
|align="center"  rowspan=2 |LillooetOpposition
|align="center"|William M. Brown
||    
|-
|
|
|
|
||    
|align="center"|William Saul
||    
|-
|
|
|
|
||    
|align="center"  |NanaimoOpposition
|align="center"|James Atkinson Abrams
||    
|-
|
|
|
|
||    
|align="center" rowspan=2 |VictoriaOpposition
|align="center"|Thomas Basil Humphreys
||    
|-
|
|
|
|
||    
|align="center"|James Thomas McIlmoyl
||    
|-
|
|
|
|
||    
|align="center" rowspan=4 |Victoria CityIndependentOpposition
|align="center"|Robert Beaven 
||    
|-
|
|
|
|
||    
|align="center"|James Smith Drummond
||    
|-
|
|
|
|
||    
|align="center"|John William Williams
||    
|-
|
|
|
|
||    
|align="center"|William Wilson
||    
|-
|
|align-left"|
|-
| align="center" colspan="10"|Source: Elections BC
|-
|}

Further reading & references

In the Sea of Sterile Mountains: The Chinese in British Columbia, Joseph Morton, J.J. Douglas, Vancouver (1974).  Despite its title, a fairly thorough account of the politicians and electoral politics in early BC.

See also 

List of British Columbia political parties

1878
1878 elections in Canada
1878 in British Columbia